Ans is a town in Silkeborg Municipality, Denmark.

References

Cities and towns in the Central Denmark Region
Silkeborg Municipality